The Embassy of the Democratic People's Republic of Korea in London is the diplomatic mission of North Korea to the United Kingdom. The official residence of the Ambassador of North Korea to the United Kingdom, it is located in a detached house at 73 Gunnersbury Avenue on the northern corner junction with Baronsmede, in Ealing, a suburban district of west London. It is notable for being one of the few embassies in London located in a suburban area, away from the central diplomatic areas of the city. The seven-bedroom property was purchased by the North Korean government for £1.3 million in 2003.

History
In November 2014, an exhibition of art from the Mansudae Art Studio was held at the embassy, to coincide with the visit of four North Korean artists to London.

The former deputy ambassador Thae Yong-ho defected to South Korea in 2016. The ambassador at the time was Hyon Hak-bong. , Hyon is reported to have been recalled to North Korea following Thae's defection. North Korean leader Kim Jong-un reportedly ordered the execution of those who failed to prevent Thae's defection. Choe Il was subsequently appointed ambassador to London. The regime took extra steps to discourage diplomats from defecting.

In September 2017 a suspicious package was found outside of the embassy. As a result, the area's roads and homes were closed and evacuated by the Metropolitan Police who also carried out a controlled explosion. After the controlled explosion, it was found that the package was non-threatening.

See also

Embassy of the United Kingdom, Pyongyang
Foreign relations of North Korea
List of diplomatic missions of North Korea
North Korea–United Kingdom relations

References 

North Korea
London
North Korea–United Kingdom relations
Buildings and structures in the London Borough of Ealing
Gunnersbury